Tattler may refer to:

 A person who likes to tattle, gossip or "telltale"
 Tattler (语丝)  important Chinese weekly journal founded in 1924 
 The Tattler, the student newspaper of Ithaca High School in Ithaca, New York
 Tattler (bird), a shorebird
 Tattler (newsletter), the "Newsletter for the East Asian-Australasian Flyway"
 Tattler, an open-source software distribution of Drupal for mining the Web for specific information
 "Tattler", a song by Ry Cooder on his 1974 album Paradise and Lunch
 "The Tattler", a song by Linda Ronstadt on her 1976 album Hasten Down the Wind, a cover of the Ry Cooder song
 "The Tattler" (Brooklyn Nine-Nine), an episode of the sixth season of Brooklyn Nine-Nine

See also
 "You Can't Stop a Tattler", a 1929 song by Washington Phillips on which the songs by Ry Cooder and Linda Ronstadt are based
 
 
 Tatler (disambiguation)
 Tattletale (disambiguation)